A starship is a theoretical vehicle for interstellar travel.

Starship may also refer to:

Film and television
 Spacecraft in Star Trek, many of which are known as starships
Starship (film), a 1985 science fiction film by Roger Christian 
Starship: Rising, a 2014 science fiction film by Neil Johnson
Starship: Apocalypse, a 2014 sequel science fiction film to Starship: Rising

Literature
Starship (fanzine), published from 1963–1984 by Andrew Porter
Starship (novel) or Non-Stop, a 1958 science fiction novel by Brian Aldiss
"Stellar Ships" or "Star Ships", a 1944 science fiction story by Ivan Yefremov

Music
Jefferson Starship, an American rock band formed in 1974 from members of Jefferson Airplane
Starship (band), formed in 1984 from members of Jefferson Starship
Starship EP, an EP by Zion I
"Starships" (song), a song by Nicki Minaj
Starship (musical), a musical by StarKid Productions
Starship (album), an album of music from the theatre production
Starship Entertainment, a South Korean music label

Vehicles
 The Starship, an aircraft used by Led Zeppelin and other bands in the 1970s
 Beechcraft Starship, a small executive aircraft
 M60A2 Starship, an American tank
 SpaceX Starship, a space vehicle being developed by SpaceX

Video games
Star Ship, a 1978 video game for the Atari 2600
Starship 1, a 1976 Atari video game
Sid Meier's Starships, a video game released in 2015

Other uses
Starship Children's Health, a hospital in Auckland, New Zealand
Starship Technologies, a delivery robot company

See also

 Pole star, the ship star used in navigation
 Shipstar, a novel by Larry Niven and Gregory Benford, see Gregory Benford bibliography
 Shipstar Shipping Services, the operator of transport ship 
Spaceship (disambiguation)
Rocketship (disambiguation)

 Star (disambiguation)
 Ship (disambiguation)